Paul Jason Warwick  (29 January 1969 – 21 July 1991) was a British racing driver.

Career 
Paul Warwick was born in Alresford, Hampshire, and was the younger brother of fellow racing driver Derek Warwick.  He began his junior career in British stock car racing in 1981 in the Ministox formula, before progressing to Superstox for the 1984 season, aged just 15 (due to altering his age on his race licence) racing against many older and much more experienced racers, under the Spedeworth organisation at tracks such as his local Aldershot Stadium and Foxhall Stadium, Ipswich. His brother Derek was the English and World Champion in the formula. Paul became National Champion in 1984 at Ipswich, East Anglian Champion and also British Champion in 1985 at Wisbech.

In his first season of Formula Ford 1600 in 1986, he won eight of the 12 Dunlop-Autosport Star of Tomorrow rounds on his way to the title and scored a championship double by claiming the Townsend Thoresen Junior FF1600 series. In 1987, Warwick moved up to Formula Ford 2000 and was the Euroseries runner-up to future Grand Prix driver JJ Lehto.

Warwick spent three seasons in British Formula 3 from 1988 to 1990. In 1988 he raced for Eddie Jordan Racing, transferring to Intersport Racing in 1989 and Superpower in 1990. Although tipped as a possible championship contender, Warwick fell short of expectations. During the 1990 season, he quit Formula 3 and contested some Formula 3000 races in the Leyton House backed March Formula 3000 team. The car was poor and Warwick was unable to shine at the rounds he contested, but he adapted to the power increase with some competitive showings. The rounds he took part in were at Brands Hatch, Birmingham, Le Mans and Nogaro. In 1991 he signed with Nigel Mansell's Mansell Madgwick British Formula 2 racing team.

Warwick dominated the first five races of 1991, scoring five pole positions, five fastest laps, four lap records and five wins, but he was killed in an accident at the fifth event of the season at Oulton Park race circuit, Cheshire. The win was awarded posthumously as he was leading the race when the accident took place. Warwick had scored enough points in the races he had contested to allow him to win the British Formula 3000 championship. The car disintegrated and Warwick was thrown from it. Investigations concluded that a front wishbone failure caused the crash.

Awards and tributes 

In 1991 an award by Autosport magazine for the National Driver of the Year was renamed the Paul Warwick Memorial Trophy that was awarded to the season's best British young racing driver.

The main entrance bridge at Oulton Park is named in his memory. In addition, the Knickerbrook corner was slowed by the addition of a chicane.

Racing results

Complete International Formula 3000 results
(key) (Races in bold indicate pole position) (Races 
in italics indicate fastest lap)

Complete British Formula 3000 results
(key) (Races in bold indicate pole position) (Races 
in italics indicate fastest lap)

References

 Driver Database stats
 Speedsport Profile
 Paul Warwick Tribute

1969 births
1991 deaths
English racing drivers
British Formula Three Championship drivers
Racing drivers who died while racing
Sport deaths in England
International Formula 3000 drivers
British Formula 3000 Championship drivers
People from Alresford